Omoglymmius rimatus is a species of beetle in the subfamily Rhysodidae. It was described by R.T. & J.R. Bell in 1982.

References

rimatus
Beetles described in 1982